This is a list of Portuguese television related events from 2016.

Events
January 10 - Deolinda Kinzimba wins the third series of The Voice Portugal.
January 14 - CMTV joins NOS.
March 27 - Luís Nascimento wins A Quinta: O Desafio
May 1 - 15-year-old singer Micaela Abreu wins the second series of Got Talent Portugal.

Television shows

Programs debuting in 2016

Programs ending in 2016

Television films and specials

Programs returning in 2016

International programs/seasons premiering in 2016

Births

Deaths

References